Zhaoyuan County, formerly Rear Gorlos Banner, is a county in the west-central part of Heilongjiang Province, China, bordering Jilin province to the south. The postal code is 166500. The county seat is located in Zhaoyuan Town.

Some farms in Zhaoyuan county with alkaline soil are experimenting rice cultivation with hybrid saltwater-tolerant rice.

Administrative divisions
Zhaoyuan consists of 8 towns and 8 townships. 

Towns: Zhaoyuan, Xinzhan, Maoxing, Erzhan, Sanzhan, Toutai, Gulong, Guqia
Townships: Minyi, Yishun, Haode, Daxing, Fuxing, Heping, Chaodeng, Bohetai

Climate

References

 
County level divisions of Heilongjiang
Daqing